This article displays the women singles qualifying draw of the 2011 Italian Open (tennis).

Players

Seeds

Qualifiers

Lucky losers
  Zheng Jie
  Angelique Kerber

Qualifying draw

First qualifier

Second qualifier

Third qualifier

Fourth qualifier

Fifth qualifier

Sixth qualifier

Seventh qualifier

Eighth qualifier

References
 Qualifying Draw

Women's Singles Qualifying
Italian Open – Singles Qualifying
Qualification for tennis tournaments